Sharora (Russian and Tajik: Шарора)) is a town and jamoat in Tajikistan. It is part of the city of Hisor in Districts of Republican Subordination. The population of the town is 14,300 (January 2020 estimate).

References

Populated places in Districts of Republican Subordination
Jamoats of Tajikistan